Jiří Šplíchal (born 23 August 2005) is a Czech footballer who currently plays as a forward for Táborsko.

Career statistics

Club

Notes

References

2005 births
Living people
Czech footballers
Association football forwards
Czech National Football League players
FC Silon Táborsko players